The Ritoque Formation (Kiri, Kirt) is a geological formation of the Altiplano Cundiboyacense, Eastern Ranges of the Colombian Andes. The formation consists of grey siltstones, limestones and fine sandstones intercalated.

Definition 
The formation was first defined and named by Etayo in 1968 after the vereda Ritoque of Villa de Leyva.

Description

Lithologies 

Stratigraphy and depositional environment 
The Ritoque Formation overlies the Rosablanca and Arcabuco Formations and is overlain by the Paja Formation. The age has been estimated to be Early Hauterivian. Stratigraphically, the formation is time equivalent with the Macanal Formation.

Outcrops 

The Ritoque Formation is found, apart from its type locality near Villa de Leyva, Boyacá, found in the vicinity.

Regional correlations

See also 

 Geology of the Eastern Hills
 Geology of the Ocetá Páramo
 Geology of the Altiplano Cundiboyacense

References

Bibliography

Maps

External links 
 

Geologic formations of Colombia
Cretaceous Colombia
Lower Cretaceous Series of South America
Hauterivian Stage
Siltstone formations
Limestone formations
Shallow marine deposits
Formations
Geography of Boyacá Department